Monroe Mills is an unincorporated community in Knox County, in the U.S. state of Ohio.

History
Monroe Mills was named for a gristmill built in 1844 on the site in Monroe Township. A post office called Monroe Mills was established in 1849, and remained in operation until 1902.

References

Unincorporated communities in Knox County, Ohio
1844 establishments in Ohio
Populated places established in 1844
Unincorporated communities in Ohio